Chambers House is a historic home located at Newark in New Castle County, Delaware.  It was built in 1890 and is a two-story, frame dwelling in the Queen Anne style.  It features cross gables, bay windows, and a wrap-around porch.  Also on the property is a contributing carriage house.  It was the home of the Chambers family until 1980, after which it was purchased by the University of Delaware. It currently serves as the University's Venture Development Center, which is a laboratory for students and faculty developing new businesses.

It was added to the National Register of Historic Places in 1983.

References

Houses on the National Register of Historic Places in Delaware
Queen Anne architecture in Delaware
Houses completed in 1890
Houses in Newark, Delaware
University of Delaware
National Register of Historic Places in New Castle County, Delaware